Fadesa Inmobiliaria, S.A. was a Spanish real estate company.

In 2007, the company was the subject of a friendly takeover by rival Martinsa resulting in the creation of Martinsa-Fadesa.

History
Fadesa was established on 24 July 1980 by Manuel Jove as Edificaciones Coruñesas, S.A. On the 31 October 1997, Edificaciones Coruñesas bought Urbanizador Inmobiliaria Fadese, S.A.U., Indelar S.A.U., and Coditecsa, S.L.U. adopting the corporate name of one of these companies - Urbanizadora Inmobiliaria Fadese, S.A. (Fadesa). On 23 April 1999 Urbanizadora Inmobiliaria Fadese changed their name to Fadesa Inmobiliaria, S.A.

On 30 April 2004 at the height of the Spanish property bubble, Fadesa floated 33% of its capital on the Madrid Stock Exchange with the company valued between 1.2 and 1.4 billion euros.

Sponsorship
From 2001 to 2008 Fadesa was the shirt sponsor of the Spanish football club Deportivo de La Coruña. They also sponsored Intervíu Fadesa (futsal), Ayamonte CF (football)  and Ceuta-Fadesa (sailing).

See also
 Spanish property bubble
 Grupo14

References

External links
 Fadesa Inmobiliaria, S.A. —  Bolsa de Madrid
 Fadesa Inmobiliaria, S.A. — Comisión Nacional del Mercado de Valores
 Fadesa Inmobiliaria, S.A. — Hoover's

Real estate companies of Spain
Companies based in Galicia (Spain)
Real estate companies established in 1980
Real estate companies disestablished in 2007